Emmanuel Aznar (23 December 1915 – 4 October 1970) was a French footballer.

Career
Anzar, a left-footed wing half with a ferocious shot, played a total of 169 games and scored 118 goals for Olympique de Marseille. However this figure includes "war championship" (1939–1945) games which were mostly held in separate seasons for the occupied and "free" part of the country, and so are not considered official.

He won the Coupe de France with Marseille in 1938 and as captain in 1943, and the French championship in 1937 and 1948. On 22 May 1943, during the cup final against Bordeaux, Aznar scored a 31st-minute goal which made a hole in the netting (which he claimed was more a sign of the poor equipment available at that time, rather than the power of his shot).

On 4 October 1942, Aznar set an unofficial record by scoring 9 goals in one match against Avignon Foot 84 (Marseille won 20–2), despite being substituted in the 66th minute due to injury. He scored 8 goals in the first half, and is the only player to have scored nine goals in one match in professional French football history. That season he went on to finish as the league's top scorer with 45 goals in 30 league matches and a total of 56 goals in 38 matches including coupe de France games.

Manu, whose career like many others, was upset by the war, had also suffered from a lack of international recognition, playing just one friendly for France in a 1–6 defeat against Bulgaria on 24 March 1938.

After the war he became only a supplement player for Marseille, but contributed to the 1947/48 league campaign with 6 goals in only 8 matches, helping them to win the French championship again.

He died of a heart attack during a Marseille veterans football match at the age of 54 on 4 October 1970, twenty-eight years to the day after his memorable feat against Avignon. He was wearing the Marseille football shirt.

Honours
 Ligue 1 (2) 1937, 1948
 Coupe de France (2) 1938, 1943

References

External links
 biography at om1899.football.fr (French)
 Player card at om-passion.com
 
 
 

1915 births
1970 deaths
French footballers
France international footballers
Ligue 1 players
Olympique de Marseille players
People from Sidi Bel Abbès
Association football wing halves